A number of ships have been named Ocean King, including:

, a Hong Kong steamship in service 1964–71
, a Philippines ferry which capsized in 2009

Ship names